Once Again is a 2018 Indian romantic drama film written and directed by Kanwal Sethi. Starring Shefali Shah and Neeraj Kabi, the film follows two middle-aged people, one a famous actor, another a restaurateur, falling in love with each other. Rasika Dugal, Bidita Bag and Priyanshu Painyuli appear in supporting roles.

The film was originally written in German since Sethi is Indian-German; Later it was translated in English and Hindi. It won the best project award in Work-in-Progress Lab at the Film Bazaar in Goa and later also other awards. Shah also sang a song for the film. Once Again was released on Netflix on 1 September 2018 and also had a limited theatrical release in metro cities on 8 December.  It has been also released in Germany by Arsenalfilm and France with great reviews from the critics.

Plot 
Amar is an ageing film star. A famous and wealthy man, he lives alone in Mumbai, a city of 15 million souls, the city of dreams. Tara, a widow, runs a small restaurant with the help of her son, who delivers Amar's meals. Tara has never seen Amar - except on the big screen. What began by pure chance a year ago has now turned into a ritual: for hours on end they talk to each other on the phone. Until one day, when Amar sets out to meet Tara in the flesh.

Cast 
Shefali Shah as Tara Shetty
Neeraj Kabi as Amar Kumar
Rasika Dugal as Sapna, Amar's daughter
Bidita Bag as Meera, Tara's daughter 
Priyanshu Painyuli as Dev, Tara's son
Mridanjali Rawai as Kiran, Dev's fiancee
Suparna Marwah as Kiran's mother
Bhagwan Tiwari as Ashok, Amar's driver
Anushka Sawhney as an actress
Prabhat Raghunandan as a director
Karim Hajee as a producer
Suchitra Tyagi as a reporter
Amit Chakrabarty as the bank manager
Narender Jatliy as a cook
Sameer Jani as restaurant server
Sanjay Bhatia as restaurant client
Zarin Variava as restaurant client
Brijesh Karanwal
Navtej Johar as a dancer (cameo)
Anil Panchal as a dancer
Chandra Shekhar as a street artist
Suruchi Sharma as a street artist

Reception 
The film was loved by the critics as well as by the audience and was for many weeks on the top of popular list of Netflix. Famous film critic Ajay Brahmbhatt tweeted immediately after watching the film : "From trailer I was guessing Once again must be lyrical film." After watching I will say its more than lyrical. It's a wonderful love story Bhawana Somaaya a Film critic wrote "saw a sensitive film Once Again must watch for all who are not so young and in love super performances from the lead." Sabash K. Jha wrote "Just finishes watching Once Again is like well cooked dish it acquires flavourful composure in a slow burn enriching fulfilling. Shefali and Neeraj are magnificent".

Sankhayan Ghosh from Filmcompanion said that Director Kanwal Sethi has a keen eye for detail. While The Lunchbox shows us how they fall in love, how they carry out their relationship over letters slipped into the dabba, and ends with the first time they decide to meet, when Once Again begins, Amar and Tara have already found each other .

Rahul Desai from The Hindu said: Two hearts in the same space, cornered into a huddle by the vacuum facing them. Much of the quiet, stream-of-consciousness film explores their hesitance to recognise these signs of their spatial dynamics (The Hindu) Trisha Gupta writes in India Today; Once Again artfully depicts a middle aged couple drifting into love. Unlike the plotted safety of Ritesh Batra's film Lunchbox though, Tara and Amar meet several times, letting the charmed flame of their phone banter flicker into unscripted disappointment. Dipti Kharude of The Quint reviewed: "The way the camera tenderly caresses Shefali in the film, the subtlest shifts in her character's emotions become discernible."

Ipshita Mitra of The Wire observed that the film "shows the coming together of two disparate yet similar stories of separation and despair woven by two broken middle-aged people like patchwork on the fabric of survival".  JA Ganesh Nadar of Rediff.com wrote: "One needs a fair amount of patience to watch Once Again as it takes you through the complexities of love in the evening of the couple's lives." Johnson Thomas of The Free Press Journal called it "a sensitively handled, evocatively performed adult love story that steals its romantic conceit from Lunchbox".

References

External links 
 

Indian direct-to-video films
Indian romantic drama films
2010s Hindi-language films
Films about actors
2018 direct-to-video films
Hindi-language Netflix original films
2018 romantic drama films